Paar is a surname. Notable people with the surname include:

Howard Paar, British music supervisor
Jack Paar (1918–2004), American radio and television talk show host
Johann Christoph von Paar (died 1636), Austrian noble
Karel Paar (born 1945), Czech cyclist
Karel Eduard Paar (born 1934), Czech knight of the Sovereign Military Order of Malta
Margit Paar, West German-German luger
Vladimir Paar (born 1942), Croatian physicist

See also
Kurt Van De Paar (born 1978), Belgian footballer